Jean Kyoung Frazier is a Korean American novelist and screenwriter.

Work

Frazier is the author of the novel Pizza Girl, published by Doubleday in 2020, and a contributor to Unpublishable, an anthology edited by Chris Molnar for Archway Editions. In 2021 Pizza Girl was nominated for the Lambda Literary Award for Lesbian Fiction.

Among other work, she has written for Law & Order: Organized Crime.

Bibliography

Fiction
Pizza Girl (2020). Doubleday

Anthologies
 Unpublishable (2020). Archway Editions/Simon & Schuster

References

External links 
 www.gojeanfraziergo.com

Living people
University of Southern California alumni
American writers of Korean descent
American women novelists
American women short story writers
Year of birth missing (living people)
21st-century American women